Feltonville is an unincorporated community in Delaware County in the U.S. state of Pennsylvania. Feltonville is located at the intersection of Felton Ave. and Bethel Road adjacent to Interstate 95/U.S. Route 322 in Chester Township northwest of the city of Chester.

References

Unincorporated communities in Delaware County, Pennsylvania
Unincorporated communities in Pennsylvania